María del Carmen "Maica" García Godoy (born 17 October 1990) is a Spanish female water polo player, playing at the centre forward position. She is part of the Spain women's national water polo team. At the 2012 Summer Olympics, she won a silver medal competing for the Spain women's national water polo team in the women's event. She plays for the Spanish club CN Sabadell.

She competed at the 2014 and 2016 Women's European Water Polo Championship.

See also
 List of Olympic medalists in water polo (women)
 List of world champions in women's water polo
 List of World Aquatics Championships medalists in water polo

References

External links
 

1990 births
Living people
Sportspeople from Sabadell
Spanish female water polo players
Water polo centre forwards
Water polo players at the 2012 Summer Olympics
Water polo players at the 2016 Summer Olympics
Water polo players at the 2020 Summer Olympics
Medalists at the 2012 Summer Olympics
World Aquatics Championships medalists in water polo
Medalists at the 2020 Summer Olympics
Olympic silver medalists for Spain in water polo
Sportswomen from Catalonia
Water polo players from Catalonia